The Sound of Sonny is an album by jazz saxophonist Sonny Rollins, his first recorded for the Riverside label, featuring performances by Rollins with Sonny Clark, Roy Haynes and Percy Heath or Paul Chambers.

Reception

The Allmusic review by Lindsay Planer states: "A new phase in Sonny Rollins' career began in 1957. He started what was at the time an almost blasphemous trend of recording for a number of different labels. His pioneering spirit yielded a few genre-defining albums, including this disc. His performances were also at a peak during 1957 as Down Beat magazine proclaimed him the Critics' Poll winner under the category of 'New Star' of the tenor saxophone. This newfound freedom can be heard throughout the innovations on The Sound of Sonny. Not only are Rollins' fluid solos reaching newly obtained zeniths of melodic brilliance, but he has also begun experimenting with alterations in the personnel from tune to tune."

Track listing
 "The Last Time I Saw Paris" (Oscar Hammerstein II, Jerome Kern) - 2:58
 "Just in Time" (Betty Comden, Adolph Green, Jule Styne) - 3:59
 "Toot, Toot, Tootsie, Goodbye" (Ernie Erdman, Ted Fio Rito, Gus Kahn, Robert A. King) - 4:25
 "What Is There to Say?" (Vernon Duke, E.Y. "Yip" Harburg) - 4:56
 "Dearly Beloved" (Jerome Kern, Johnny Mercer) - 3:05
 "Ev'ry Time We Say Goodbye" (Cole Porter) - 3:23
 "Cutie" (Sonny Rollins, Neal Hefti, Stanley Styne) - 5:54
 "It Could Happen to You" (Johnny Burke, Jimmy Van Heusen ) - 3:47
 "Mangoes" (Dale Libby, Sid Wayne) - 5:34
 "Funky Hotel Blues" (Sonny Rollins) - 6:00 Bonus track on CD rerelease
Recorded in New York City on June 11 (tracks 5, 6 & 8), June 12 (tracks 2, 3, 7 & 9), and June 19 (tracks 1, 4 & 10), 1957

Personnel
Sonny Rollins – tenor saxophone
Sonny Clark - piano (except 1 & 8)  
Percy Heath - bass (tracks 2-3, 5-7 & 9)
Paul Chambers - bass (tracks 1, 4 & 10)
Roy Haynes - drums (except 8)

References

1957 albums
Riverside Records albums
Sonny Rollins albums
albums produced by Orrin Keepnews